Lymphoid-specific helicase (Lsh) is a member of the SNF2 helicase family of chromatin remodeling proteins that in humans is encoded by the HELLS gene.

The HELLS gene has proved to play critical roles in DNA methylation, chromatin packaging, control of Hox genes, stem cell proliferation, and developing lymphoid tissue.

In a developing embryo, epigenetic programming is controlled through the mechanisms of DNA methylation and chromatin organization. These processes are the master regulators that determine which genes are turned on or off throughout development. Lsh, a protein encoded by the HELLS gene is a major regulator of methylation patterns and thus crucial to normal fetal development.

Mutations and knockouts of the HELLS gene severely disrupts the process of fetal programming. In mice, knockout of HELLS gene resulted in death of embryos at birth and caused embryonic growth retardation. In humans, hypomethylation caused by a mutation in the HELLS gene is linked to Immunodeficiency-centromeric instability-facial anomalies syndrome 4 (ICF4). This is a rare disease that causes immunodeficiency, facial anomalies, growth retardation, failure to thrive, and psychomotor retardation. The adverse effects due to the absence and mutation of the HELLS gene is a result of the extensive loss of genomic wide methylation and the abnormal expression of repeat sequences. The disruption in methylation patterns can cause the silencing of genes or the over-expression of genes, leading to abnormal and in some cases fatal developmental consequences.

This gene encodes a lymphoid-specific helicase. Other helicases function in processes involving DNA strand separation, including replication, repair, recombination, and transcription. This protein is thought to be involved with cellular proliferation and may play a role in leukemogenesis. Alternatively spliced transcript variants have been described, but their biological validity has not been determined.

References

Further reading

External links